The Antlia Cluster (or Abell S0636) is a cluster of galaxies located in the Hydra–Centaurus Supercluster. The Antlia Cluster is the third-nearest to the Local Group after the Virgo Cluster and Fornax Cluster. The Antlia Cluster should not be confused with the Antlia Dwarf galaxy.

Antlia is classified as a rare Bautz–Morgan type III cluster, meaning it has no central dominant (cD) brightest cluster galaxy. However, the cluster is dominated by two massive elliptical galaxies, NGC 3268 and NGC 3258, and contains a total of about 234 galaxies. The cluster is very dense compared to other clusters such as Virgo and Fornax, thus containing early-type galaxies and a larger portion of dwarf ellipticals. The cluster is split into two galaxy groups, the Northern subgroup gravitating around NGC 3268, and the Southern subgroup centered on NGC 3258.

The cluster has an overall redshift of z = 0.0087, implying that the cluster is, like most objects in the Universe, receding from the Local Group. Using the now-obsolete scientific satellite ASCA, X-ray observations show that the cluster is almost isothermal, with a mean temperature of kT ~ 2.0 keV.

List of named objects in the Antlia Cluster

See also
 Coma Cluster
 Eridanus Cluster
 List of galaxy groups and clusters
 Norma Cluster

References

Further reading

Burnham Jr., Robert (1978) Burham's Celestial Handbook Revised Edition Vol. 1 of 3. Dover Publications. New York

External links

 

 
Galaxy clusters
S0636
Abell richness class 0
Hydra-Centaurus Supercluster